Tlacojalpan is a municipality located in the south zone in the State of Veracruz, Mexico, about  from state capital Xalapa. It has a surface of 91.30 km2. The name comes from the language Náhuatl, Tlahco-xal-pan; that means “In the half of the sandbank".

Geographic limits

The municipality of Tlacojalpan is delimited to the north by Cosamaloapan, to the east by Tuxtilla, to the south by Oaxaca State and to the west by Otatitlán. It is watered by creeks that are tributaries of the Papaloapan River.

Agriculture

It produces principally maize, beans, rice, sugarcane and mango.

Celebrations

In Tlacojalpan, in January takes place the celebration in honor to San Cristobal, Patron of the town, and in December takes place the celebration in honor to Virgen de Guadalupe.

Weather

The weather in Tlacojalpan is very warm and wet all year with rains in summer and autumn.

References

External links 

  Municipal Official webpage
  Municipal Official Information

Municipalities of Veracruz